Gerard Koel (born 16 January 1941) is a retired Dutch cyclist who was active between 1962 and 1973. He won a bronze medal in the 4 km team pursuit at the 1964 Summer Olympics. In 1966 he turned professional and won two six-day races: in Madrid in 1967 and in Amsterdam in 1973, as well as one stage of the Olympia's Tour in 1965. Nationally he earned titles in the sprint (1968 and 1969) and scratch in 1970. After retiring from competitions he worked as a driver for Dutch television during the Tour de France.

See also
 List of Dutch Olympic cyclists

References

1941 births
Living people
Dutch male cyclists
Olympic cyclists of the Netherlands
Cyclists at the 1964 Summer Olympics
Olympic bronze medalists for the Netherlands
Olympic medalists in cycling
Cyclists from Amsterdam
Medalists at the 1964 Summer Olympics